Hansaka is the first village located on Rewari-Delhi road in the Rewari district of Haryana, India, approximately  from the city of Rewari. Hansaka Gram Panchayat is a relatively large village, comprising nine wards and 1,600 voters . The village population is dominated by the Ahirs.Three big temples in village one is of goddess shera wali mata mandir and one is Shiv temple opposite to the lane of Shri Baldev Singh Yadav and last is at Village bus stop stand. And four small Temples. And its bus stop connects 10 villages.

References

Villages in Rewari district